In algebraic topology, the nilpotence theorem gives a condition for an element in the homotopy groups of a ring spectrum to be nilpotent, in terms of the complex cobordism spectrum . More precisely, it states that for any ring spectrum , the kernel of the map  consists of nilpotent elements.

Nishida's theorem

 showed that elements of positive degree of the homotopy groups of spheres are nilpotent. This is a special case of the nilpotence theorem.

References

 .
 Open online version.

Further reading 
Connection of X(n) spectra to formal group laws

Homotopy theory
Theorems in algebraic topology